Alburnus scoranza is a species of ray-finned fish in the genus Alburnus. it occurs only in the basins of Lake Skadar in Montenegro, Albania and Lake Ohrid the Republic of Macedonia.

References

scoranza
Fish described in 1858